The presence of Colombians in Spain dates back to Colombian independence from Spain.

Numbers
The total number of Colombian-born residents in Spain as of 2020 is 513,583, out of which 239,452 hold Spanish citizenship and 274,131 hold Colombian citizenship. 

In 2015 in Spain there were 145,490 Colombian nationals in Spain and 203,675 Colombian-born naturalized Spanish citizens. The total Colombian-born population in Spain for that year was 356,475 people. The overall Colombian population decreased significantly due to emigration as the result of Spain's protracted 2008-2016 economic crisis, increasing again over the past three years to record levels upon economic recovery.

Foreign population of Colombian citizenship in Spain

Notable people

See also
Spanish Colombian
Colombia–Spain relations
Immigration to Spain

References

History of Colombia
Ethnic groups in Spain
Colombian diaspora